Aak  is a genre of Korean court music.  It is an imported form of the Chinese court music yayue, and means "elegant music". Aak was performed almost exclusively in state sacrificial rites, and in the present day it is performed in certain Confucian ceremonies.

Background

Aak was brought to Korea in 1116 through a large gift of 428 musical instruments as well as 572 costumes and ritual dance objects from China, a gift to Emperor Yejong of Goryeo from Emperor Huizong of Song.  It remained very popular for a time (there were originally no fewer than 456 different melodies in use) before dying out. It was revived in 1430, based on a reconstruction of older melodies, and preserved in "Treatise on Ceremonial Music" (Aak Po), a chapter of the Sejong Annals.

Aak is one of three types of Korean court music; the other two are dangak and hyangak.  Aak is similar to dangak in that both have Chinese origins.  All the instruments used in aak are derived from Chinese originals, and very few of these are used in other kinds of traditional Korean music.  Aak was first performed at the Royal Ancestral Shrine in the Goryeo period as ritual music of the court.  The definition of aak later became narrowed to music for Confucian rituals, although aak in its broadest sense can still mean any kind of refined or elegant music and therefore can arguably encompass dangak and hyangak.

The music is now performed by members of the Kungnip Kugagwŏn National Center for Korean Traditional Performing Arts in Seoul.

Performance
The music is now highly specialized, and it is played only at certain ceremonies, in particular the Seokjeon Daeje held each spring and autumn at the Munmyo shrine in the ground of Sungkyunkwan University in Seoul to honour Confucius.  It may also be performed at special concerts.

There are two instrumental ensembles – a "terrace" ensemble located on the porch of the main shrine, and a "courtyard" ensemble located near the main entrance in front of the main shrine building. The music performances or munmyo jeryeak may be accompanied by dances called munmyo ilmu. There are two forms of dances; one a "civil" dance, the other a "military" dance, performed by 64 dancers in an 8x8 formation.

The modern repertoire of aak consists of just two different surviving melodies.  Both the two surviving pieces have 32 notes that last around 4 minutes when performed, and one of the two is performed in a number of transpositions. The music is played very slowly.  Each note is drawn out for around four seconds, with the wind instruments rising in pitch at the end of the note, giving it a distinctive character.

Players 

 Lee Ju-hwan

See also
Akhak Gwebeom
Culture of Korea
Gagaku
Jongmyo Jeryeak
Korean music
Nhã nhạc
Traditional Korean musical instruments
Yayue

References

External links
A Study of Musical Instruments in Korean Traditional Music (The National Center for Korean Traditional Performing Arts, Ministry of Culture and Tourism, Republic of Korea, 1998) (link is dead)
Old recordings of aak in the 1960s A collection of Korean court music videos

Korean styles of music